

pf
Pfizer-E
Pfizerpen

ph

pha
phanquinone (INN)
Pharmaseal Scrub Care

phe

phen

phena-phend
phenacaine (INN)
phenacemide (INN)
phenacetin (INN)
phenactropinium chloride (INN)
phenadoxone (INN)
phenaglycodol (INN)
phenamazoline (INN)
phenampromide (INN)
Phenaphen
phenarsone sulfoxylate (INN)
Phenazine
phenazocine (INN)
phenazone (INN)
phenazopyridine (INN)
phencyclidine (INN)
phendimetrazine (INN)

phene-phenm
phenelzine (INN)
Phenergan
pheneridine (INN)
pheneticillin (INN)
Phenetron
pheneturide (INN)
phenformin (INN)
phenglutarimide (INN)
phenicarbazide (INN)
phenindamine (INN)
phenindione (INN)
pheniodol sodium (INN)
pheniprazine (INN)
pheniramine (INN)
phenmetrazine (INN)

pheno-phenu
phenobarbital sodium (INN)
phenobarbital (INN)
phenobutiodil (INN)
phenolphthalein (INN)
phenomorphan (INN)
phenoperidine (INN)
phenothiazine (INN)
phenothrin (INN)
phenoxybenzamine (INN)
phenoxymethylpenicillin (INN)
phenprobamate (INN)
phenprocoumon (INN)
phenpromethamine (INN)
phensuximide (INN)
phentermine (INN)
phentolamine (INN)
Phenurone

pheny
Pheny-Pas-Tebamin
phenylalanine (INN)
phenylbutazone (INN)
phenylephrine (INN)
phenylmercuric borate (INN)
phenylpropanolamine (INN)
phenyltoloxamine (INN)
phenyracillin (INN)
Phenytek
phenythilone (INN)
phenytoin (INN)

pher-phet
Pherazine
phetharbital (INN)

phi-phy
Phiso-Scrub
Phisohex
pholcodine (INN)
pholedrine (INN)
Phoslo
Phosphocol P32
Phospholine Iodide
Phosphotec
Phosphotope
Photofrin
Photofrin (QLT Phototherapeutics Inc.)
phoxim (INN)
Phrenilin
phthalylsulfamethizole (INN)
phthalylsulfathiazole (INN)
Phyllocontin
Physiolyte
Physiosol
phytomenadione (INN)
phytonadiol sodium diphosphate (INN)